James Doyle McDuffie (November 17, 1929 – May 21, 2015) was an American educator and politician.

Born in Kannapolis, North Carolina, McDuffie went to Pfeiffer University, Lenoir–Rhyne University and then graduated from Catawba College. He joined the United States Air Force after college and was stationed in Denver, Colorado. McDuffie then received his bachelor's degree in history from University of Denver. In 1954, McDuffie and his wife moved to Charlotte, North Carolina where he was a coach and teacher in junior high school. Then, in 1956, he worked for State Farm insurance agency. McDuffie served on the Charlotte City Council. McDuffie then served in the North Carolina Senate as a Republican. McDuffie died in Charlotte in 2015.

Notes

1929 births
2015 deaths
Politicians from Charlotte, North Carolina
People from Kannapolis, North Carolina
Catawba College alumni
Lenoir–Rhyne University alumni
Pfeiffer University alumni
University of Denver alumni
Businesspeople from North Carolina
Educators from North Carolina
Charlotte, North Carolina City Council members
Republican Party North Carolina state senators
20th-century American businesspeople